Hans Kroes (born 3 June 1965 in Lisse, South Holland) is a former freestyle and backstroke swimmer from The Netherlands, who competed for his native country at two consecutive Summer Olympics, starting in 1984. His best individual result in Los Angeles, California was the eighth place in the 100 m backstroke (58.07).

References

1965 births
Living people
Olympic swimmers of the Netherlands
Dutch male freestyle swimmers
Dutch male backstroke swimmers
Swimmers at the 1984 Summer Olympics
Swimmers at the 1988 Summer Olympics
People from Lisse
European Aquatics Championships medalists in swimming
Universiade medalists in swimming
Universiade silver medalists for the Netherlands
Universiade bronze medalists for the Netherlands
Medalists at the 1987 Summer Universiade
Sportspeople from South Holland
20th-century Dutch people